Bête Noire is an international comics anthology published by Fantagraphics Books. While planned to be four issues, only the first issue was published.

Issue one
The first issue featured the following artists:
Suzy Amakane (Japan)
MS Bastian (Switzerland)
Frédéric Coché (France)
Ichiba Daisuke  (Japan)
Adam Dant (United Kingdom)
Ludovic Debeurme (France)
Lucie Durbiano (France)
Quentin Faucompré (France)
Anke Feuchtenberger (Germany)
Reijo Karkkainen (Finland)
Peter Köhler (Sweden)
Ben Jones (United States)
Olaf Ladousse (Spain)
Junko Mizuno (Japan)
Morgan Navarro (France)
Takeshi Nemoto (Japan)
Helge Reumann (Switzerland)
Caroline Sury (Japan)
Henriette Valium (Canada)
Fabio Viscogliosi (Italy)
F© + Witko (France)
Yuichi Yokoyama (Japan)

References
Bête Noire #1, Spring 2005; Fantagraphics Books.

External links
Hidden Gems Sale spotlight: Chris Polkki, Fantagraphics.com
comicbookbin.com review

Fantagraphics titles
Comics anthologies